'Ara'ir  is a town in the Madaba Governorate of north-western Jordan, thought to be the biblical town of Aroer. Aroes in Hellenistic and Roman periods.

References

Populated places in Madaba Governorate